Maroochy North Shore Australian Football Club was an Australian rules football club based on the Sunshine Coast which competed in the Pineapple Hotel Cup division of the Queensland Australian Football League from 2005 to 2011.

Demerger

Seven years after Maroochydore and Northshore amalgamated for mutual gain in the senior ranks, the former has severed the partnership and gone it alone.
 
The decision to de-amalgamate was reached when Maroochydore held a special general meeting on 29 March. 
The new entity will be known as the Maroochydore Australian Football Club, or the Roos.
 
That was the name of the club when it folded at the end of the 1999 season, before its rebirth as Maroochy Northshore for the start of the 2005 season.
 
Northshore will be known as the Northshore Jets Australian Football Club.

External links
Maroochy North Shore sportingpulse website

References

Queensland State Football League clubs
2005 establishments in Australia
2011 disestablishments in Australia
Australian rules football clubs established in 2005
Maroochydore
Australian rules football clubs disestablished in 2011